Lucky Corrigan or Fury and the Woman is a 1936 American-Canadian drama film directed by Lewis D. Collins and starring William Gargan, Molly Lamont and James McGrath.

It was later screened at the 1984 Festival of Festivals as part of Front & Centre, a special retrospective program of artistically and culturally significant films from throughout the history of Canadian cinema.

Cast
 William Gargan as Bruce Corrigan  
 Molly Lamont as June McCrae  
 James McGrath as Kinky Kinkaid  
 Reginald Hincks as Engineer  
 J.P. McGowan as Anderson  
 Libby Taylor as Sarah  
 Henry Hastings as Ling  
 Ernie Impett as Bart  
 Arthur Kerr as Lester  
 Bob Rideout as Red  
 David Clyde as McCrae

References

Bibliography
 Mike Gasher. Hollywood North: The Feature Film Industry in British Columbia. UBC Press, 2002.

External links
 

1936 films
1936 drama films
1930s English-language films
American drama films
Canadian drama films
English-language Canadian films
Films directed by Lewis D. Collins
Columbia Pictures films
American black-and-white films
Canadian black-and-white films
1930s American films
1930s Canadian films